Yujiulü Nagai (pinyin: Yùjiǔlǘ Nàgài) (?–506) was ruler of the Rouran (492–506) with the title of Houqifudaikezhe Khagan (侯其伏代庫者可汗). He was the second son of Yujiulü Tuhezhen. According to Pengling Wang, his name might be cognate with Middle Mongol Nogai (in Mongolian script:; Khalkha:нохой ), meaning "dog".

Under reign of Yujiulü Doulun 
He fought against Gaoche ruler Afuzhiluo (阿伏至羅) who together with his younger cousin Qiongqi (穷奇), they managed their clans of over 100,000 yurts to escape from the pursuing armies, led by Doulun and Nagai in 487. While Doulun had limited success, Nagai won all his battles against the Gaoche.

Reign 
In 492, he seized the position of khagan from his nephew Yujiulü Doulun thanks to a successful coup d'état by nobles. He later asked for physicians, craftsmans and artisans from Southern Qi emperor Wu, which was denied. 

In 501, King of Gaochang, Ma Ru (馬儒) was overthrown and killed, and the people of Gaochang appointed Qu Jia (麴嘉) of Jincheng (in Gansu) as their king. Qu Jia hailed from the Zhong district of Jincheng commandery (金城, roughly corresponding to modern day Lanzhou, Gansu) Qu Jia at first pledged allegiance to the Rouran. Having secured his borders, Nagai started to raid northern borders of Northern Wei same year.

In September 504, he led the 120,000 cavalry to Northern Wei in six directions. He directly drove Woye Town (now northeast of Urad Front Banner, Inner Mongolia), Huaiyu Town (now southwest of Guyang County, Inner Mongolia) and went to Dai Commandery and Heng Commandery, however he was eventually stopped by Wei general Yuan Huai (源怀). 

He died in 506 and succeeded by Yujiulü Futu.

Family 
He had four sons, two of them is known to history - Futu and Dengshuzi of whom both became khagans.

References

Sources 

History of the Northern Dynasties, vol. 86.
Book of Wei, vol 103

 

Khagans of the Rouran